Andrew Beerwinkel (born 5 March 1993) is a South African professional rugby union player for the  in the Currie Cup and Rugby Challenge. He can play as a loosehead or tighthead prop.

Career

Youth rugby

Beerwinkel grew up in the Western Cape and attended Porterville High School. In 2009, he was selected to represent his local provincial side, Boland, at the Under-16 Grant Khomo Week competition. He also represented Boland at the premier South African high school rugby union competition, the Under-18 Craven Week, in both 2010 and 2011. His performance in the 2011 edition also led to his selection in a South African Schools side, playing one match against France.

Blue Bulls / UP Tuks / S.A. Under-20

The started both their semi-final win against the same opposition and the final, which they narrowly lost 18–22 against  in Durban.

At the start of 2013, Beerwinkel made two substitute appearances for a  side which won the 2013 Varsity Cup. He was then selected for the South Africa Under-20 that attempted to retain their IRB Junior World Championship title in the 2013 edition held in France. He scored South Africa's first points in the competition, getting a try after just 5 minutes in their first Pool A match against the United States, helping them to a 97–0 victory. He also started their next match, a 31–24 victory over England, and helped South Africa finish the pool stages with a perfect record, playing off the bench in their 26–19 victory against hosts France in their final match of the pool stages. He started their semi-final match against Wales, but couldn't prevent his side slipping to a 17–18 defeat. He was named on the bench for their final match, the third-place play-off against New Zealand, but didn't feature in the 41–34 victory as South Africa secure third spot in the competition.

Beerwinkel returned to domestic action, representing the  side on seven occasions during the 2013 Under-21 Provincial Championship. In similar fashion to his season with the Under-19s the previous year, his side made it all the way to the final, only to lose to Western Province in the final to finish the competition as runners-up.

Despite Beerwinkel not featuring in the play-offs, the Blue Bulls went on to win the trophy, beating  20–10 in the final.

Eight appearances (and a try against Gauteng rivals ) followed for UP Tuks in the 2015 Varsity Cup, before Beerwinkel became involved in the ' Vodacom Cup side. He made his senior debut for the Blue Bulls in Round Five of the 2015 Vodacom Cup, coming on as a replacement in their 44–0 victory over Namibian side  in Windhoek.

References

South African rugby union players
Living people
1993 births
People from Drakenstein Local Municipality
Rugby union props
Blue Bulls players
Bulls (rugby union) players
South Africa Under-20 international rugby union players
Golden Lions players
Pumas (Currie Cup) players
Griquas (rugby union) players
Rugby union players from the Western Cape